Boocock is a surname of English origin. At the time of the British Census of 1881, its frequency was highest in Yorkshire (8.0 times the British average), followed by Lancashire and Northumberland. In all other British counties its frequency was below national average. The name Boocock may refer to:
Irvine Boocock (born 1890, died unknown), English footballer
Joan Boocock Lee (1922–2017), English-American voice actress and wife of comic artist Stan Lee
Nigel Boocock (born 1937), English speedway rider
Eric Boocock (born 1945), English speedway rider
Mark Boocock (born 1963), English cricketer
Paul Boocock (born 1964), American actor and writer
Justin Boocock (born 1975), Australian slalom canoer

References